EHC Klostersee is an ice hockey team in Grafing, Germany. They play in the Oberliga, the third level of professional ice hockey in Germany. The club was founded in 1957.

External links
Official site

Ice hockey teams in Germany
Ice hockey clubs established in 1957
Ice hockey teams in Bavaria
1957 establishments in West Germany
Ebersberg (district)
Sport in Upper Bavaria